Ganga Chhu is a river in the Tibet Autonomous Region, China. It is located between lake Manasarovar ( MSL) and Rakshas Tal ( MSL). Since May 2010, owing to a fall in the level of lake Manasarovar, the visible source of the river from Manasarovar is absent. However, owing to the presence of hot wells at a monastery, the river Ganga Chhu nevertheless bears the waters of Lake Rakshas Tal.

References

Rivers of Tibet
Hindu pilgrimage sites in China
Buddhist temples in Tibet